The Association for Computing Machinery SIGARCH Maurice Wilkes Award is given annually for outstanding contribution to computer architecture by a young computer scientist or engineer; "young" defined as having a career that started within the last 20 years. The award is named after Maurice Wilkes, a computer scientist credited with several important developments in computing such as microprogramming. The award is presented at the International Symposium on Computer Architecture. Prior recipients include:
 2022 - Moinuddin Qureshi
 2021 - Thomas Wenisch
 2020 - Luis Ceze and Karin Strauss
 2019 - Onur Mutlu
2018 - Gabriel Loh
 2017 – Lieven Eeckhout
 2016 – Timothy Sherwood
 2015 – Christos Kozyrakis
 2014 – Ravi Rajwar
 2013 – Parthasarathy (Partha) Ranganathan
 2012 – David Brooks
 2011 – Kevin Skadron
 2010 – Andreas Moshovos
 2009 – Shubu Mukherjee
 2008 – Sarita Adve
 2007 – Todd Austin
 2006 – Doug Burger
 2005 – Steve Scott
 2004 – Kourosh Gharachorloo
 2003 – Dirk Meyer
 2002 – Glenn Hinton
 2001 – Anant Agarwal
 2000 – William J. Dally
 1999 – Gurindar S. Sohi
 1998 – Wen-mei Hwu

See also

 ACM Special Interest Group on Computer Architecture
 Computer engineering
 Computer science
 Computing
 List of computer science awards
 List of computer-related awards

References

External links
 Official page

Computer-related awards
Computer science awards